The 2004–05 FIS Ski Jumping World Cup was the 26th World Cup season. It began in Kuusamo, Finland on 27 November 2004 and finished in Planica, Slovenia on 20 March 2005. The individual World Cup was won by Janne Ahonen, Finland.

Lower competitive circuits this season included the Grand Prix and Continental Cup.

Calendar

Men

Men's team

Individual World Cup

Kuusamo 

 K-120 Kuusamo, Finland
November 27, 2004

 K-120 Kuusamo, Finland
November 28, 2004

Lillehammer
 K-120 Lysgårdsbakkene, Norway
December 4, 2004

 K-120 Lysgårdsbakkene, Norway
December 5, 2004

Harrachov
 K-120 Harrachov, Czech Republic
December 11, 2004

 K-120 Harrachov, Czech Republic
December 12, 2004

Engelberg
 K-120 Engelberg, Switzerland
December 18, 2004

 K-120 Engelberg, Switzerland
December 19, 2004

Four Hills Tournament

Oberstdorf 

 K-115 Oberstdorf, Germany
December 29, 2004

Garmisch-Partenkirchen
 K-115 Garmisch-Partenkirchen, Germany
January 1, 2005

Innsbruck
 K-120 Innsbruck, Austria
January 3, 2005

Bischofshofen
 K-120 Bischofshofen, Austria
January 6, 2005

Willingen
 K-120 Willingen, Germany
January 9, 2005

Bad Mitterndorf
 K-185 Bad Mitterndorf, Austria
January 15, 2005

 K-185 Bad Mitterndorf, Austria
January 16, 2005

Titisee-Neustadt
 K-120 Titisee-Neustadt, Germany
January 22, 2005

 K-120 Titisee-Neustadt, Germany
January 23, 2005

Zakopane
 K-120 Zakopane, Poland
January 29, 2005

 K-120 Zakopane, Poland
January 30, 2005

Sapporo
 K-120 Sapporo, Japan
February 5, 2005

 K-120 Sapporo, Japan
February 6, 2005

Pragelato
 K-120 Pragelato, Italy
February 11, 2005

Nordic Tournament

Lahti

 K-120 Lahti, Finland
March 6, 2005

Kuopio
 K-120 Kuopio, Finland
March 9, 2005

Lillehammer
 K-120 Lysgårdsbakkene, Norway
March 11, 2005

Oslo
 K-115 Holmenkollen, Norway
March 13, 2005

Planica
 K-185 Planica, Slovenia
March 19, 2005

 K-185 Planica, Slovenia
March 20, 2005

Team World Cup

Willingen

Pragelato
 K-120 Pragelato, Italy
February 12, 2005

Lahti
 K-120 Lahti, Finland
March 5, 2005

References
2004-05 Ski Jumping World Cup

Fis Ski Jumping World Cup, 2004-05
Fis Ski Jumping World Cup, 2004-05
FIS Ski Jumping World Cup